USS Richland is a name used more than once by the U.S. Navy:

 , a cargo ship commissioned 22 April 1945 for service in World War II.
 , a floating drydock commissioned as YFD-64 on 28 November 1944.

United States Navy ship names